HMNZS Breeze (T02) was a coastal cargo boat which was requisitioned by the Royal New Zealand Navy (RNZN) and converted into a minesweeper.

Breeze was owned by the Canterbury Steam Shipping Company.

Operational history
Breeze joined the 25th Minesweeping Flotilla at Tulagi in April 1943. They carried out night-time patrol and escort duties under COMSOPAC control. The Japanese were well north by this time, but occasionally made sudden attacks into American strongholds around Guadalcanal.

Grazing port to port, she had a boat wrecked.

During convoy escort duty in Ironbottom Sound she was attacked, but not damaged, by dive-bombers.

From time to time the flotilla boats would return to Auckland for refits, usually escorting freighters bound the same way.

By the middle of 1944 the owners were demanding the return of Breeze and her twin Gale. COMSOPAC released her on 10 November 1944.

Fate
She was sold to the Philippines in 1964 and renamed Balabac in 1966.

See also
Minesweepers of the Royal New Zealand Navy

References
 McDougall, R J  (1989) New Zealand Naval Vessels. Page 69-78. Government Printing Office.

Further reading
 Harker, Jack (2000)The Rockies: New Zealand Minesweepers at War. Silver Owl Press.

External links
 Picture of Breeze
 Boiler cleaners Watercolour by Russell Clark

Gale-class minesweepers
Military history of New Zealand
Ships built on the River Clyde
1933 ships